Sachin Shinde (born 29 September 1987) is an Indian cricketer. He made his Twenty20 debut for Services in the 2016–17 Inter State Twenty-20 Tournament on 29 January 2017. He made his List A debut for Services in the 2016–17 Vijay Hazare Trophy on 28 February 2017.

References

External links
 

1987 births
Living people
Indian cricketers
Services cricketers
People from Belgaum